is one of the original 40 throws of Judo as developed by Jigoro Kano. It belongs to the fourth group,
Dai Yonkyo, of the traditional throwing list, Gokyo-no-Nagewaza, of Kodokan Judo. It is also part of the current 67 Throws of Kodokan Judo. It is classified as a rear sacrifice technique, Sutemi-waza.

Technique Description 
The Sumi Gaeshi is done by grabbing your uke opposite you by their clothing, more specifically below the collar. The tori then plants their foot or knee in the opposite upper thigh, taking care not to hit the groin. The tori then rolls backwards using the forward momentum of the opponent to propel them forward. This can be followed up with any number of grapples, joint extensions, or choke holds.

Included Systems 
Systems:
Kodokan Judo, Judo Lists
Lists:
The Canon Of Judo
Judo technique

Similar Techniques, Variants, and Aliases 

Similar techniques:

Tomoe nage

hikikomi gaeshi

English aliases:
Corner throw
Corner reversal

External links 
 Information on the Techniques of Judo.

Judo technique
Throw (grappling)